Martin McLeod (April 13, 1813 – November 20, 1860) was an American fur trader, pioneer, and territorial legislator in Minnesota.

McLeod was born in Montreal, Quebec, Canada and had Scottish ancestry. He worked as a clerk in Montreal and then traveled to Fort Snelling, Wisconsin Territory in 1837. He worked as a trader for the American Fur Company, overseeing trade with the Sisseton and Wahpeton bands. McLeod served in the Minnesota Territorial Council from 1849 to 1851 and from 1852 to 1853. McLeod served as president of the territorial council. He also served as chairman of the town of Bloomington, Minnesota Territory and as a commissioner for Hennepin County, Minnesota.

Family
McLeod married Mary Elizabeth Ortley in 1837 or 1838.  The couple had five children, Walter Scott (b. 1841), John (b. 1843), Mary Elizabeth (b. 1844), Janet (b. 1848), and Isabella (b. 1851).

References

External links

1813 births
1860 deaths
Pre-Confederation Canadian emigrants to the United States
People from Bloomington, Minnesota
Politicians from Montreal
Members of the Minnesota Territorial Legislature
19th-century American politicians
American fur traders
American Fur Company people